Imam-ud-Din Shahbaz (or ID Shahbaz) was a Punjabi evangelist and a poet (in present-day Pakistan). His notable work is the first metrical translation of the Psalms in Punjabi known as Punjabi Zabur. He chose Shahbaz, meaning the King of the Falcons, as his takhallus.

Early life 
Shahbaz was born in 1845 in Zafarwal in a Muslim family and converted to Christianity at the age of 10. He was appointed as a teacher at Church Missionary Society in Amritsar in 1866 where he was baptised by Robert Clark. He worked as a teacher in various missionary schools for nine years.

References 

Evangelists
1845 births
1921 deaths
Converts to Protestantism from Islam
Translators of the Bible into Punjabi